Bucal is an urban and lakeside barangay in Calamba, Laguna, in the Philippines. Colloquially known by local drivers and passengers as Letran and sometimes JP-Rizal due to the two buildings being well known in the barangay, Bucal is the second tourist spot in the city along with Pansol. The barangay borders Laguna de Bay. Bucal's name originated from bukal or hot spring.

Healthcare
The José Rizal Memorial Hospital is a hospital in Calamba. The first hospital in the city, it was established before Calamba Medical Center (CMC). This public hospital is located at the southeastern edge of the city.

Neighboring Barangays
 West - La Mesa
 East - Laguna de Bay
 South - Pansol
 North - Halang

Schools
 Pre-Elementary
 Bucal Day Care Center
 Pre-Elementary & Elementary
 Bucal Elementary School
 St. Elizabeth Anne School
 Bucal Cambridge
 Maranatha & Eden Hill School
 Pre-Elementary to College
 Colegio de San Juan de Letran

Population
 2014- 13,217
 2013- 12,708
 2012- 12,326
 2011- 11,783
 2010- 11,346
 2007- 12,171
 2000- 10,002
 1995- 9,131
 1990- 6,100
 1980- 3,888

Hospital
 JP Memorial Hospital

References

External links
 Official Website of the Provincial Government of Laguna

Barangays of Calamba, Laguna